John Senekerim was the ruler of the Kingdom of Hereti from 951 to 959. John is the only known child of King Ishkhanik. During his reign Hereti reached an apex of power and prestige, mainly after the annexation of the right bank of Caucasian Albania. Armenian historian Movses Kaghankatvatsi calls him the "restorer of the Kingdom of Albania". Later he annexed parts of Kakheti and adopted the title of "King of the Tsanars". John had a good relations with the representatives of the Sallarid dynasty (Daylam) and with David III Kuropalates of Tao. Like his father Ishkhanik and grandmother Dinar, he contributed a lot to the conversion of his kingdom. He died in 959 without heirs. As a result the prince of Kakheti Kvirike II took the opportunity to annex his estates.

Sources 
 Papuashvili T. (1970), Problems of the history of Hereti, Tbilisi
 Papuashvili T., Georgian Soviet Encyclopedia, V, p. 288, Tbilisi, 1980

Monarchs of Hereti
959 deaths
Year of birth unknown
10th-century people from Georgia (country)